What I Do is the twelfth studio album by American country music artist Alan Jackson. It was released on September 7, 2004, and produced four singles for Jackson on the Hot Country Songs charts: "Too Much of a Good Thing" and "Monday Morning Church" both reached #5, while "The Talkin' Song Repair Blues" and "USA Today" both reached #18. What I Do, however, was the first album of his career not to produce any #1 hits.

The Wrights, a duo composed of Adam and Shannon Wright (the former of whom is Jackson's nephew) are featured as background vocalists on "If Love Was a River", which they also co-wrote. Adam Wright also wrote the track "Strong Enough".

Critical reception

Giving the album all four stars, People magazine said on the album that Jackson "continues to sound more and more like Merle Haggard, which is tantamount to approaching perfection."

Track listing

Personnel

 Monty Allen – background vocals
 Eddie Bayers – drums
 Stuart Duncan – fiddle, mandolin
 Mark Fain – bass guitar
 Robbie Flint – steel guitar
 Paul Franklin – steel guitar, lap steel guitar
 Dave Gaylord – fiddle
 Lloyd Green – steel guitar
 Danny Groah – electric guitar
 Alan Jackson – acoustic guitar, lead vocals, background vocals
 Kirk "Jelly Roll" Johnson – harmonica
 Dave Kelley – mandolin
 Patty Loveless – background vocals on "Monday Morning Church"
 Brent Mason – electric guitar, six-string bass guitar
 Monty Parkey – piano
 Hargus "Pig" Robbins – piano
 Matt Rollings – piano
 Bruce Rutherford – drums
 Tom Rutledge – acoustic guitar
 John Wesley Ryles – background vocals
 Tony Stephens – acoustic guitar
 Richard Sterban – background vocals on "Burnin' the Honky Tonks Down"
 Bruce Watkins – acoustic guitar, banjo
 Roger Wills – bass guitar
 Glenn Worf – bass guitar
 Adam Wright – background vocals on "If Love Was a River"
 Shannon Wright – background vocals on "If Love Was a River"

Chart performance
What I Do debuted  at #1 on the U.S. Billboard 200 selling 139,000 copies, becoming his third  #1 album, and #1 on the Top Country Albums, becoming his seventh #1 country album. The album was certified Platinum by the RIAA in October 2004.

Weekly charts

Year-end charts

Sales and Certifications

References

External links
 

2004 albums
Alan Jackson albums
Arista Records albums
Albums produced by Keith Stegall